This is a list of  story writers in Turkish and short story writers from Turkey.

K 
 Fatih Kırtorun
 Hamed Zubair Koshay
 Yaşar Kemal

N 
 Aziz Nesin

S 
 Ömer Seyfettin

T 
 Hasan Ali Toptaş

See also
Turkish literature

Short story writers